Lord Sussex Lennox (11 June 1802 – 12 April 1874) was an English cricketer. He was associated with Marylebone Cricket Club and was recorded in one first-class match in 1826, totalling 5 runs with a highest score of 3 and holding no catches. His father was Charles Lennox, 4th Duke of Richmond and his mother was Lady Charlotte Gordon, best remembered for the Duchess of Richmond's ball  which she threw the night before the Battle of Waterloo.

Personal life and death
He married the Hon. Mary  Lawless, daughter of Valentine Lawless, 2nd Baron Cloncurry, and his first wife Elizabeth Georgiana Morgan, and had three children, Sussex junior, Berkeley and Charles. The marriage caused some comment as Mary had divorced her first husband, Henry Fock, 3rd Baron De Robeck, to marry him, an unusual step for the time (although her parents' marriage had also ended in divorce, following a notorious lawsuit by her father against her mother for criminal conversation).

References

1802 births
1874 deaths
English cricketers
English cricketers of 1826 to 1863
Marylebone Cricket Club cricketers
Younger sons of dukes